Russell Hughes may refer to:

 Russell Hughes (American football), American football coach
 Russell P. Hughes (born 1946), American/British chemist
 Russell S. Hughes (1910–1958), film screenwriter
 La Meri (Russell Meriwether Hughes, 1899–1988), American ethnic dancer, choreographer, teacher, poet, and scholar